M120 or M-120 may refer to:

 M120 mortar, a mortar in United States Army infantry and armor units
 M120 Rak, Polish self-propelled gun
 M-120 (Michigan highway), a state highway in Michigan
 Mercedes-Benz M120 engine, a V12 automobile piston engine
M120 (Cape Town), a Metropolitan Route in Cape Town, South Africa